Uwe Detlef Walter von Schamann  (born April 23, 1956) is a former professional American football placekicker. He played for the Miami Dolphins of the National Football League, from 1979 to 1984.

Early life
Von Schamann was born in Berlin, West Germany. He moved to Fort Worth, Texas at the age of 16. After graduating from Eastern Hills High School in 1975, he received a football scholarship to the University of Oklahoma.

College career
During his college football career, he was a member of the 1975 National Championship team, and was later voted the all-time, All-Big 8 kicker. In 1999 von Schamann was named the All-Century Oklahoma Kicker. He was most noted for making a clutch game-winning kick in the final seconds of the 1977 game at Ohio State, after leading the crowd in a "block that kick" chant.  In Sooner lore, this play came to be known simply as "The Kick."

Professional career
After college, the Miami Dolphins drafted von Schamann, for whom he played for six seasons.
Von Schamann finished his NFL career with 101 of 149 field goal attempts (67%) and 237 of 250 extra points (94%), for 540 total points. In the 1984 season he set an NFL record, with 70 extra point attempts, converting 66 of them, records that stood until they were broken by Patriots kicker Stephen Gostkowski in 2007. A clip from the 1984 season of von Schamann kicking is used in Ace Ventura: Pet Detective.

After football
After his retirement from the NFL, he worked in the securities and insurance business.

In 2001, von Schamann was named Director of Development and Fundraising for the J.D. McCarty Center, a treatment facility for children with developmental disabilities.

References

External links
 career stats
 "The Kick" Video

Miami Dolphins players
Oklahoma Sooners football players
1956 births
Living people
German emigrants to the United States
Sportspeople from Berlin
People from Fort Worth, Texas
American football placekickers
German players of American football
German expatriates in the United States